The Round Barn, Bruce Township Section 6 was located in Bruce Township, Benton County, Iowa, United States. It was built in 1914 as a general purpose barn. The building was a true round barn that measured  in diameter. The barn was constructed of clay tile from the Johnston Brothers' Clay Works and it featured a conical roof. The structure did not have a cupola, but there was a silo that rose from the center. It was listed on the National Register of Historic Places (NRHP) in 1986.

The barn has subsequently been torn down. It was removed from the NRHP in 2019.

References

Infrastructure completed in 1914
Buildings and structures in Benton County, Iowa
Barns on the National Register of Historic Places in Iowa
Round barns in Iowa
National Register of Historic Places in Benton County, Iowa
Former National Register of Historic Places in Iowa